Adam Arkin (born August 19, 1956) is an American actor and director.  He is known for playing the role of Aaron Shutt on Chicago Hope. He has been nominated for numerous awards, including a Tony (Best Actor, 1991, I Hate Hamlet) as well as three primetime Emmys, four SAG Awards (Ensemble, Chicago Hope), and a DGA Award (My Louisiana Sky). In 2002, Arkin won a Daytime Emmy for Outstanding Directing in a Children's Special for My Louisiana Sky. He is also one of the three actors to portray Dale "The Whale" Biederbeck on Monk. Between 2007 and 2009, he starred in Life. Beginning in 1990, he had a recurring guest role on Northern Exposure playing the angry, paranoid Adam, for which he received an Emmy nomination. In 2009, he portrayed villain Ethan Zobelle, a white separatist gang leader, in Sons of Anarchy and as Principal Ed Gibb in 8 Simple Rules (2003–2005). His father Alan Arkin and brother Matthew are also actors.

Early life 
Arkin was born in Brooklyn, New York City, to actor, director and writer Alan Arkin and his first wife Jeremy Yaffe. Arkin joined his parents singing in the children's music group the Baby Sitters, along with Lee Hays and Doris Willens. He graduated from Horace Greeley High School in Chappaqua, New York. Arkin is Jewish.

Career 
Arkin guest-starred in the award-winning television show Happy Days in episode 35, season 2 in 1975.  Also in 1975, he made a guest appearance on Barney Miller (episode: "Grand Hotel").  His first starring role in television was as Lenny Markowitz, the central character in the 1977 series Busting Loose. He since has appeared in various television series such as A Year in the Life (1988), The Twilight Zone (1986), Northern Exposure (CBS, 1990–1995), where he played the mercurial barefooted chef Adam, and Chicago Hope (CBS, 1994–2000). He appeared in two Law & Order episodes, "Self Defense" (season three, 1992) as jewelry store owner George Costas and "Red Ball" (season 16, 2005) as a district attorney named Charles Graham. He also appeared in Picket Fences (season two, episode 13). Other television appearances include The West Wing (1999) (as trauma specialist and psychiatrist Dr. Stanley Keyworth), Frasier, as an obsessive fan of Frasier, for which he was nominated for a Primetime Emmy Award for Outstanding Guest Actor in a Comedy Series, Boston Legal, Baby Bob, Monk and 8 Simple Rules for Dating My Teenage Daughter (2002). In 2007, he starred in the NBC drama Life in the role of Ted Earley. He played a white separatist leader named Ethan Zobelle during the second season of the series Sons of Anarchy. In 2011, he appeared in The Closer episode "To Serve with Love" (season seven). He also portrayed mob boss Theo Tonin on Justified in 2011 and an FBI agent in The Chicago Code.

Arkin's film appearances include Hitch (2005) and Halloween H20: 20 Years Later (1998). He has performed in Broadway, off-Broadway, and regional theatre productions, including both the South Coast Repertory world premiere and Broadway production of Brooklyn Boy by playwright Donald Margulies. In addition, he is known for his directing work, having done episodes of Grey's Anatomy, Boston Legal, The Riches, Dirt, Ally McBeal,  Sons of Anarchy, The Blacklist, Justified, and Masters of Sex. He won an Emmy for directing the Showtime television film My Louisiana Sky. In April 2008, Arkin guest-starred in the web series Gorgeous Tiny Chicken Machine Show. He played the part of a divorce lawyer in the film A Serious Man (2009), directed by Ethan and Joel Coen.

Arkin also played a minor role in the radio drama of Star Wars as the voice of Fixer. For PBS, he voiced Meriwether Lewis in Ken Burns' The Voyage of the Corps of Discovery (1997). He also provided character voice work for the Emmy-winning series The National Parks.

He has directed three episodes of the 2013 Cold War television drama The Americans, is co-executive producer of the television series Get Shorty, directed the final episode of the second season (2014) of Masters of Sex, and directed the final two episodes of the critically acclaimed second season (2015) of Fargo, in which he also had a minor role.

Personal life 
He has a daughter Molly with his first wife Linda. He was married to Phyllis Anne Lyons from 1999 to 2013, and they had one son together. Phyllis filed for divorce in August 2013. He married Michelle Dunker in 2017.

Filmography

Film

Television

References

External links 
 
 
 
 Interview at Broadway.com

1956 births
Living people
Male actors from New York City
American male film actors
American male stage actors
American male television actors
American television directors
American people of Ukrainian-Jewish descent
Jewish American male actors
20th-century American male actors
21st-century American male actors
People from Brooklyn
Horace Greeley High School alumni
21st-century American Jews